Cran's bully (Gobiomorphus breviceps) is a species of fish in the family Eleotridae endemic to New Zealand, where it is only found in fresh waters.

References

External links
 Photograph of male
 Photograph of female

Cran's bully
Endemic freshwater fish of New Zealand
Cran's bully
Cran's bully